Joseph Tomlinson (11 November 1823 in London – 22 April 1894) was a British railway engineer, and executive.

Life
After leaving school in 1837, he joined his father, who was passenger superintendent, at the Stockton and Darlington Railway.

From 1846 to 1852, he was outdoor foreman for J. V. Gooch. 
In 1851, at the time of the Great Exhibition, he was working for the London and South Western Railway, and often drove the special train which took Prince Albert from Windsor to Waterloo and back, often accompanied by his two sons, the Prince of Wales and Prince Alfred.
From 1854 to 1858, Outdoor Superintendent to Matthew Kirtley for the Midland Railway.  
From 1872 to 1885, he was resident engineer and locomotive superintendent of the Metropolitan Railway.

He was President of the Institution of Mechanical Engineers in 1890 and 1891, and Chairman of the Research Committee on Friction.

References

External links

1823 births
1894 deaths
English railway mechanical engineers